Aaron Joshua "Josh Strike" Atayde (born March 10, 1986) is a DJ, TV host, and sports anchor for ABS-CBN Sports' coverage of the UAAP. He is now sports anchor for UFL on AKTV and doing courtside reportage for PBA.

Life and career
Atayde is a son of Tony the Green Mind, and a brother to Nike Philippines' Tony Atayde.

Atayde is a graduate of AB Communication Arts in De La Salle University. He started his career as a courtside reporter for UAAP Seasons 70 and 71 for Adamson University Soaring Falcons. After serving for 2 years, he went-on to be part of the play-by-play panel since 2009.

He hosts the Quick-E technology show for Studio 23.

Atayde started out as one of the Junior Jocks of Magic 89.9 radio for the year 2007. He uses the moniker, "Josh Strike".

He is currently doing courtside reporting for PBA on AKTV and being the main presenter of UFL.

He is also one of the host for "SLAMRadioPH", A weekly podcast about the PBA  in slamonlineph.com.

Filmography

TV
 Wildcard (2008–2010) ABS-CBN Sports
 Quick-E (2009–2010) Studio 23
 Pa-Bida Ka! (2010–2011) Studio 23
 PBA on AKTV (2011–2014) AKTV
 UFL (2011–2013) AKTV 
 NCAA on Sports5 (2012-2014)  AKTV 
 PBA Money Ball: Dribol of Da Pipol (2014) TV5
 PBA on TV5 (2014–present) as commentator TV5 
 Sports5 Center (2015–2017) as co-host TV5
  Rio Olympics Special Coverage on TV5 (2016) TV5
 SportsCenter Philippines (2017–2020) as Sports news anchor ESPN5, TV5
 Geeks and Gamers Guide (2020–present) One Sports, GG Network

Radio
The Strike Zone (2007–present)
Magic Weekend (2008–present)
The Rundown (2015–present)
Magic 30 (2008–2011)

See also
 ABS-CBN Sports
 Sports5

References

External links 
 The Official Facebook page of Aaron Atayde

1986 births
Living people
Filipino television presenters
TV5 (Philippine TV network) personalities
De La Salle University alumni
Filipino television sportscasters